Voices from the Gathering Storm: The Web of Ecological-Societal Crisis is a 2005 non-fiction book that was published by Word Association Publishers and edited by Joseph Arcos, Mary Argus and Frederick DiCarlo.

Synopsis
A collection of essays that discuss social, cultural, and technological factors contributing to our environmental predicament.  It proposes the need for a change in the religion of consumption, a change in our definitions of progress and success from increased consumption to increased stewardship of our diminishing resources and shrinking planet.

Contributors
Thomas Berry
 Sharon L. Camp
 Francesco diCastri
 Daniel D. Chiras
 Herman Daly
 Matthew P. Fox
 Michael Gregory
 Joel Hilliker
 Kaye H. Kilburn
 Margaret L. Kripke
 Janice D. Longstreth
 Lester Milbrath
 Stephen S. Morse
 Hugh Pitcher
 John Poppy
 Van Rensselaer Potter
 Ellen K. Silbergeld
 James A. Swa

Reception
The Midwest Book Review positively reviewed Voices from the Gathering Storm, calling it "expertly compiled" and a "remarkable body of study". The Times-News also praised the book, saying it was "carefully researched" and "hard-hitting".

References

External links
 Voices From the Gathering Storm

2005 non-fiction books
2005 in the environment
Environmental non-fiction books